Liu Jiang (born 8 February 1969) is a Chinese television director, producer and screenwriter best known for his work Before Dawn, A Beautiful Daughter-in-law Era and Let's get married.

Early life and education
Liu was born on February 8, 1969, in Changdao County, Shandong, with his ancestral home in Ningxiang, Hunan. In 1976, The family moved back to their hometown Ningxiang, where he attended the Ningxiang No. 1 High School. In 1988 he was accepted to the Beijing Film Academy, majoring in acting. After graduation in 1992, he was assigned to the Oriental Song and Dance Company as a singer.

Career

In 2003, Liu made his directorial debut Iron Youth, a gangster television series starring Jiang Wu, Mei Ting, Pan Yueming, and Han Yuqin.

In 2005, he directed Ju Zhong Ju. The series stars Xu Qing, Yu Hewei, Yin Tao, and Bao Lei.

In 2007, he directed Snowwolf, a television series adaptation based on the novel of the same name by Quan Yongxian.

In 2008 Liu made his film debut Set Off, a comedy film starring Liu Hua, Fan Wei and Ju Wenpei. It won the Best Directorial Debut Award at the 16th Beijing College Student Film Festival. That same year, he directed Suiyue, which marked his second cooperation with Mei Ting and Yu Hewei. Liu was signed to direct the comedy television series Fathers and Mothers in the following year, it was broadcast in QTV-1 in May 2009.

Liu rose to fame after directing A Beautiful Daughter-in-law Era (2010), which earned him an Outstanding Director Award at the 28th Flying Apsaras Awards. That same year, he also directed Before Dawn, for which he won the Most Popular Director Award at the 17th Shanghai Television Festival and was nominated for the Best Director Award.

In 2011, he directed Enemies Among Us, based on Mai Jia's novel of the same name.

In 2013, he was hired to direct Let's get married, for which he received three Best Director Awards at the 18th Chunyan Awards, the 20th Shanghai Television Festival, and the 27th Golden Eagle Awards, the China Television Artists Association’s equivalent to the Emmys.  The drama stars Huang Haibo and Gao Yuanyuan and was one of the most watched ones in CCTV while it was aired in mainland China in that year.

In 2016, Liu was confirmed as director of Let's Fall in Love, a romantic comedy television series starring Zhang Jingchu, Zhang Xinyi, Qin Lan, Yuan Hong, and Ming Dao. It is the sequel to Let's get married.

In 2018, Liu directed the romance television series The Way We Were, it stars Tiffany Tang and Luo Jin, and aired on both Dragon Television and Beijing Television.

Personal life
Liu began dating his alumna Wang Tong in July 1993. They married in Beijing in 1997.

Filmography

Film (As director)

Television (As director)

Television (As screenwriter)

Film (As producer)

Television (As producer)

Film and TV Awards

References

External links

 
 Liu Jiang on Douban 
 Liu Jiang on Mtime 

1969 births
Writers from Yantai
Living people
Beijing Film Academy alumni
Film directors from Shandong
Chinese television directors
Chinese television writers
Chinese film producers
Chinese television producers
Screenwriters from Shandong